Alfred Gregson (2 March 1889 – March 1968) was an English professional football inside left who played in the Football League for Grimsby Town and Bury.

Personal life 
Gregson was married with a daughter born in 1915 and a son, who died in infancy in May 1917. In 1914, he was working as a tinsmith. In February 1915, six months after the outbreak of the First World War, Gregson enlisted as a private with the Football Battalion of the Middlesex Regiment. He suffered a gunshot wound to the left thigh near Bruay-la-Buissière in April 1916. Gregson finished the war as a corporal in the 4th (Service) Battalion and was discharged from the army in March 1920.

Career statistics

References

English footballers
English Football League players
Association football inside forwards
Rochdale A.F.C. players
Grimsby Town F.C. players
1889 births
Footballers from Bury, Greater Manchester
British Army personnel of World War I
Middlesex Regiment soldiers
Brentford F.C. wartime guest players
Bury F.C. players
Rossendale United F.C. players
1968 deaths
Tinsmiths
Date of death unknown